An election to South Tipperary County Council took place on 5 June 2009 as part of that year's Irish local elections. 26 councillors were elected from five electoral divisions by PR-STV voting for a five-year term of office. .

Results by party

Results by Electoral Area

Cahir

Cashel

Clonmel

Fethard

Tipperary

External links

2009 Irish local elections
2009